Spirillum volutans is a gram-negative, bacterium from the genus of Spirillum which occurs in freshwater. It has an amphitrichous flagellar arrangement. Spirillum volutans is one of the largest bacteria species.

References

Nitrosomonadales
Bacteria described in 1832